Severouralsk Airport  is an airport in Russia located 6 km southeast of Severouralsk. Google Earth satellite imagery suggests that the original runway length was 2000 meters.  It handles small transport and passenger aircraft (An-24, Tu-134, Yak-40).

The airport has been disused since the early 1990s, but its infrastructure is in satisfactory condition.

References
RussianAirFields.com

Airports built in the Soviet Union
Airports in Sverdlovsk Oblast